Sarojini - Ek Nayi Pehal (International Title: Sarojini) is an Indian television drama series, which premiered on 20 July 2015. The show was produced by Rashmi Sharma Telefilms. Starring Shiny Doshi, Mohit Sehgal and Pankaj Tripathi in lead roles. Later Aamir Ali replaced Mohit Sehgal as his character was dead in the last few episodes . It aired Monday through Saturday on Zee TV. The show ended happily on 30 April 2016 with Sarojini and Rishabh's marriage with a family picture taken.

Plot
The show followed the journey of Sarojini, a strong-minded, well-educated girl who gets married into a family with a regressive patriarchal set up - a household governed, dominated and practically ruled by her over-bearing, chauvinistic father-in-law.

Cast

Main cast
 Shiny Doshi as Sarojini Somendra Singh 
 Mohit Sehgal as Somendra Dushyant Singh / Munna Singh
 Aamir Ali as Rishabh (2nd Male Lead)
 Pankaj Tripathi as Dushyant Singh (Antagonist)
 Ketaki Kadam as Indira Dushyant Singh

Supporting cast
 Purva Parag as Nirjhara Dushyant Singham
 Nitin Goswami as Bhaskar Dushyant Singh
 Salina Prakash as Sapna Bhaskar Singh
 Rakesh Pandey as Gajanan Singh
 Minakshi Verma as Arundhati Gajanan Singh
 Aanchal Khurana as Maneesha / Mannu
 Ram Awana as Sangram Singh Mannu's Father
 Alka Kaushal as Tharkeshwari Singh (Antagonist)
 Soni Singh as Sangeeta / Bijili
 Manoj Chandila as Komal Singh (Antagonist)
 Sushil Bonthiyaal as Keshav
 Mayank Gandhi as Indira's husband
 Paaras Madaan as Mayank singh

Controversy 
The show got into a controversy in March 2016, when the makers decided to do a big leap where Somendra gets killed. It became an issue when they did not tell Mohit Sehgal that he is off the show which made his fans a bit angry.

Awards

References

External links
 

Zee TV original programming
Indian television soap operas
Indian drama television series
2015 Indian television series debuts
2016 Indian television series endings